Noel Dias (4 March 1932 – 25 November 1983), better known as Saleem Raza, was a Pakistani playback singer. He started his singing career from Lahore, Pakistan and quickly gained popularity. Raza was a classically- trained singer and was more famous for singing sad songs. Raza's career suffered due to the rise of singer Ahmed Rushdi in the late 1950s. He left playback singing in 1966 as he lost his popularity with the film composers and moved to Canada where he died in 1983.

Career 
Saleem Raza was born Noel Dias in a Christian family. After the independence of Pakistan in 1947, he migrated to Pakistan and settled in Lahore. He first sang for Lahore Radio Station. Raza also made friends with an artist of the time, Mohni Hameed. Raza and Hameed were often seen attending events together.

Additionally, Raza learned music from the music composers of the day including Master Sadiq Ali, and Ustaad Aashiq Husain. He was introduced to the Pakistani film industry by veteran film music director Ghulam Ahmed Chishti. Raza's first lucky break came in director Syed Ata Ullah Hashmi's 1955 film . He lent his voice to the 'sad' musical composition,  (Duet, Saleem Raza – Kausar Perveen). He also sang as a playback singer in film producer Anwar Kamal Pasha's  in 1955. Although his big breakthrough came with the song , in Saifuddin Saif's film  (1957). He went on to sing many other songs in films like  (1957),  (1960),  (1963 film) and many more.

Career decline 
Raza remained a dominating singer in the late 1950s due to his popularity in singing tragic songs. In 1961, the music director, Khalil Ahmed, recorded a sad song, in Raza's voice for film  (1962) but he was not satisfied with his singing style. Initially, he decided to re-record the same song in Mehdi Hassan's voice but changed his mind because Hassan was facing difficulty with high notes as the composition had a wide range and variations. Khalil Ahmed finally invited the famous singer Ahmed Rushdi to sing the same song; Rushdi not only satisfied Khalil but the song was also a hit. Apart from Ahmed Rushdi, Raza was in direct competition with highly talented singers like Munir Hussain, Mehdi Hassan, Masood Rana, Mujeeb Aalam and Bashir Ahmad. Moreover, his voice was best suited for Syed Musa Raza (Santosh Kumar) and his brother Darpan. The two actors also lost their popularity in the mid-1960s. These were the basic factors which affected his popularity. Later, with the change in the recording devices, Raza found it difficult to adjust to the new equipment, resulting in a setback to his career.

Death 
Raza migrated to Vancouver, British Columbia, Canada in 1975, and established a music school there. For eight years, from 1975 to 1983, Raza taught music to numerous music students. He also started performing in local South Asian musical concerts. Raza suffered from kidney failure, which took his life on 25 November 1983. He was fifty-one years of age.

Urdu and Punjabi musical movies 
Some notable Urdu and Punjabi films for which Raza sang songs include:

Saat Lakh (1957), Ishq-e-Laila (1957), Bedari (1957), Daata (1957), Saheli (1960), Rehguzar (1960), Salma (1960), Gulfaam (1961), Saperan (1961), Azra (1962), Mousiqaar (1962), Aanchal (1962), Qaidi (1962), Seema (1963), Ik Tera Sahara (1963), Tauba (1964), Chingari (1964), Payal Ki Jhankar (1966), Noor-e-Islam (1957), Chann Mahi (1956), Kartar Singh (1959), Mouj Mela (1963).

Some popular songs 
1. , film  (1957), music by Akhtar Hussain Akhhian

2. Shah-e-Madina (saw), Yasrib kay wali, film Noor-e-Islam (1957), lyrics by Naeem Hashmi, music by Hassan Latif

3. , film  (1959)

4. , poet Tanvir Naqvi, music director Muslehuddin, film  (1960)

5. , film  (1961)

6. , film  (1962)

7. , film  (1962), music by Master Inayat Hussain

8. , music by Rashid Attre, film  (1962)

9. , film  (1963), lyrics by Qateel Shifai, music by Master Inayat Hussain

10. , film  (1964) – A Qawwali song, lyrics by Fayyaz Hashmi, music by A. Hameed

11. , film  (1965), music by A. Hameed

12. , film  (1966)

13. , music by Rashid Attre, film  (1966)

14. , film  (1957), music by Rasheed Attre

15. ,  film  (1962), music by Rasheed Attre

Awards and recognition
 Nigar Award Best Singer for film  (1960)
 Nigar Award Best Singer for film  (1963)
 Gold Medal Award in 1966 by the Pakistan Arts Council, Lahore

References

External links
 

1932 births
1983 deaths
Canadian Christians
Naturalized citizens of Canada
Pakistani emigrants to Canada
Pakistani playback singers
Pakistani Christians
Singers from Lahore
Punjabi-language singers
Urdu-language singers
Nigar Award winners
Deaths from kidney failure
20th-century Pakistani male singers